An institute of technology (also referred to as: technological university, technical university, university of technology, technological educational institute, technical college, polytechnic university or just polytechnic) is an institution of tertiary education (such as a university or college) that specializes in engineering, technology, applied science, and natural sciences.

Institutes of technology versus polytechnics
The institutes of technology and polytechnics have been in existence since at least the 18th century, but became popular after World War II with the expansion of engineering and applied science education, associated with the new needs created by industrialization. The world's first institution of technology, the Berg-Schola (today its legal successor is the University of Miskolc), was founded by the Court Chamber of Vienna in Selmecbánya, Kingdom of Hungary (now Banská Štiavnica, Slovakia), in 1735 in order to train specialists of precious metal and copper mining according to the requirements of the industrial revolution in Hungary. The oldest German Institute of Technology is the Braunschweig University of Technology, founded in 1745 as "Collegium Carolinum". Another exception is the École Polytechnique, which has educated French élites since its foundation in 1794. In some cases, polytechnics or institutes of technology are engineering schools or technical colleges.

In several countries, like Germany, the Netherlands, Switzerland, Turkey and Taiwan, institutes of technology are institutions of higher education and have been accredited to award academic degrees and doctorates. Famous examples are the Istanbul Technical University, ETH Zurich,  Delft University of Technology, RWTH Aachen and National Taiwan University of Science and Technology all considered universities.

In countries like Iran, Finland, Malaysia, Portugal, Singapore or the United Kingdom, there is often a significant and confused distinction between polytechnics and universities. In the UK, a binary system of higher education emerged consisting of universities (research orientation) and polytechnics (engineering and applied science and professional practice orientation).  Polytechnics offered university equivalent degrees mainly in STEM subjects from bachelor's, master's and PhD that were validated and governed at the national level by the independent UK Council for National Academic Awards. In 1992, UK polytechnics were designated as universities which meant they could award their own degrees. The CNAA was disbanded. The UK's first polytechnic, the Royal Polytechnic Institution (now the University of Westminster), was founded in 1838 in Regent Street, London. In Ireland the term "institute of technology" is the more favored synonym of a "regional technical college" though the latter is the legally correct term; however, Dublin Institute of Technology is a university in all but name as it can confer degrees in accordance with law, Cork Institute of Technology and other Institutes of Technology have delegated authority from HETAC to make awards to and including master's degree level—Level 9 of the Republic of Ireland's National Framework for Qualifications (NFQ)—for all areas of study and Doctorate level in a number of others.

In a number of countries, although being today generally considered similar institutions of higher learning across many countries, polytechnics and institutes of technology used to have a quite different statute among each other, its teaching competences and organizational history.  In many cases, "polytechnic" were elite technological universities concentrating on applied science and engineering and may also be a former designation for a vocational institution, before it has been granted the exclusive right to award academic degrees and can be truly called an "institute of technology". A number of polytechnics providing higher education is simply a result of a formal upgrading from their original and historical role as intermediate technical education schools. In some situations, former polytechnics or other non-university institutions have emerged solely through an administrative change of statutes, which often included a name change with the introduction of new designations like "institute of technology", "polytechnic university", "university of applied sciences" or "university of technology" for marketing purposes. Such emergence of so many upgraded polytechnics, former vocational education and technical schools converted into more university-like institutions has caused concern where the lack of specialized intermediate technical professionals lead to industrial skill shortages in some fields, being also associated to an increase of the graduate unemployment rate. This is mostly the case in those countries, where the education system is not controlled by the state and any institution can grant degrees. Evidence have also shown a decline in the general quality of teaching and graduate's preparation for the workplace, due to the fast-paced conversion of that technical institutions to more advanced higher level institutions. Mentz, Kotze and Van der Merwe argue that all the tools are in place to promote the debate on the place of technology in higher education in general and in universities of technology specifically and they posit several questions for the debate.

Institutes by country

Argentina

In the so-called Latin American docta the main higher institution advocates to the study of technology is the National Technological University which has brand ramifications through all the country geographic space in the way of Regional Faculties. The Buenos Aires Institute of Technology (ITBA) is other important recognized institute of technology with renowned and prestige in the country.

Australia

1970s–1990s
During the 1970s to early 1990s, the term was used to describe state owned and funded technical schools that offered both vocational and higher education. They were part of the College of Advanced Education system. In the 1990s most of these merged with existing universities or formed new ones of their own. These new universities often took the title University of Technology, for marketing rather than legal purposes. AVCC report The most prominent such university in each state founded the Australian Technology Network a few years later.

1990s–today
Since the mid-1990s, the term has been applied to some technically minded technical and further education (TAFE) institutes. A recent example is the Melbourne Polytechnic rebranding and repositioning in 2014 from Northern Melbourne Institute of TAFE. These primarily offer vocational education, although some like Melbourne Polytechnic are expanding into higher education offering vocationally oriented applied bachelor's degrees. This usage of the term is most prevalent historically in NSW and the ACT. The new terminology is apt given that this category of institution are becoming very much like the institutes of the 1970s–1990s period.

In 2009, the old college system in Tasmania and TAFE Tasmania have started a 3-year restructure to become the Tasmanian Polytechnic www.polytechnic.tas.edu.au, Tasmanian Skills Institute www.skillsinstitute.tas.edu.au and Tasmanian Academy www.academy.tas.edu.au

In the higher education sector, there are seven designated universities of technology in Australia (though, note, not all use the phrase "university of technology", such as the Universities of Canberra and South Australia, which used to be Colleges of Advanced Education before transitioning into fully-fledged universities with the ability – most important of all – to confer doctorates):
 Curtin University, Western Australia
 Queensland University of Technology, Queensland
 Royal Melbourne Institute of Technology, Victoria
 Swinburne University of Technology, Victoria
 University of Canberra, Australian Capital Territory
 University of South Australia, South Australia
 University of Technology, Sydney, New South Wales

Austria
Universities of technology
These institutions are entitled to confer habilitation and doctoral degrees and focus on research.

 Graz University of Technology (13,454 students, founded 1811, Hochschule since 1865, doctoral degrees since 1901, university since 1975)
 TU Wien (27,923 students, founded 1815, Hochschule since 1872, doctoral degrees since 1901, university since 1975)
 University of Natural Resources and Life Sciences, Vienna focused on agriculture (12,500 students, founded as Hochschule in 1872, doctoral degrees since 1906, university since 1975)
 University of Leoben specialized in mining, metallurgy and materials (4,030 students, founded 1840, Hochschule since 1904, doctoral degrees since 1906, university since 1975)

Research institutions
These institutions focus only on research.
 Austrian Institute of Technology (founded 1956)
 Institute of Science and Technology Austria (founded 2007)

Technical faculties at universities
Several universities have faculties of technology that are entitled to confer habilitation and doctoral degrees and which focus on research.
 Johannes Kepler University Linz (Faculty of Engineering and Natural Sciences founded 1965, university since 1975)
 University of Innsbruck (Faculty of Civil Engineering founded 1969)
 Alpen-Adria-Universität Klagenfurt (Faculty of Technical Sciences founded 2007)

Fachhochschulen
Fachhochschule is a German type of tertiary education institution and adopted later in Austria and Switzerland. They do not focus exclusively on technology, but may also offer courses in social science, medicine, business and design. They grant bachelor's degrees and master's degrees and focus more on teaching than research and more on specific professions than on science.

In 2010, there were 20 Fachhochschulen in Austria

Bangladesh
There are some public engineering universities in Bangladesh:
 Bangladesh University of Engineering and Technology (BUET)
 Chittagong University of Engineering and Technology (CUET). Formerly known as Bangladesh Institute of Technology, Chittagong.
 Khulna University of Engineering and Technology (KUET). Formerly known as Bangladesh Institute of Technology, Khulna
 Rajshahi University of Engineering and Technology (RUET). Formerly known as Bangladesh Institute of Technology, Rajshahi.
 Dhaka University of Engineering and Technology (DUET). Formerly known as Bangladesh Institute of Technology, Dhaka.

There are some general, technological and specialized universities in Bangladesh offer engineering programs:
 University of Chittagong. Engineering programs offer under the Faculty of Engineering and Technology.
 University of Dhaka. Engineering programs offer under the Faculty of Engineering and Technology.
 University of Khulna. Engineering programs offer under the Faculty of Science, Engineering and Technology.
 University of Rajshahi. Engineering programs offer under the Faculty of Engineering and Technology.
 Islamic University, Bangladesh (IU). Engineering programs offer under the Faculty of Applied Science and Technology.
 Shahjalal University of Science and Technology. Engineering programs offer under the Faculty of Applied Science and Technology.
 Bangladesh University of Textiles (BUTEX). Specialized institution that offers various engineering programs with its interdisciplinary curricula.

There are some private engineering universities in Bangladesh:
 Ahsanullah University of Science and Technology (AUST)
 Military Institute of Science and Technology (MIST)

There is only one international engineering university in Bangladesh:
 Islamic University of Technology (IUT)

There are numerous private and other universities as well as science and technology universities providing engineering education. Most prominent are:
 American International University-Bangladesh
 Bangladesh University of Business and Technology. Engineering programs offer under the Faculty of Engineering and Technology.
 North South University
 International Islamic University Chittagong
 East West University
 BRAC University
 Independent University, Bangladesh
 European University of Bangladesh

There are numerous government-funded as well as private polytechnic institutes, engineering colleges and science and technology institutes providing engineering education. Most prominent are:

 Bangladesh Institute of Glass and Ceramics
 Dhaka Polytechnic Institute
 Chittagong Polytechnic Institute
 Bangladesh Survey Institute
 Govt. Arts Graphics Institute
 Bangladesh Institute of Marine Technology
 Mymensingh Engineering College
 Narayangonj Technical School and College

Belarus
 Belarusian National Technical University (BNTU) (Minsk, Belarus)
 Belarusian State Technological University (Minsk, Belarus)
 Belarusian State University of Informatics and Radioelectronics (Minsk, Belarus)
 Brest State Technical University (Brest, Belarus)
 Pavel Sukhoi State Technical University of Gomel (Gomel, Belarus)
 Vitebsk State Technological University (Vitebsk, Belarus)

Belgium and the Netherlands
In the Netherlands, there are four technical universities, jointly known as 4TU:

 Delft University of Technology (TU Delft)
 Eindhoven University of Technology (TU Eindhoven)
 Universiteit Twente (U Twente)
 Wageningen University (Wageningen U)

In Belgium and in the Netherlands, Hogescholen or Hautes écoles (also translated into colleges, university colleges or universities of applied science) are applied institutes of higher education that do not award doctorates and do not focus on research but some research does happen. They are generally limited to Bachelor-level education, with degrees called professional bachelors, and only minor Master's programmes. The hogeschool thus has many similarities to the Fachhochschule in the German language areas and to the ammattikorkeakoulu in Finland. A list of all hogescholen in the Netherlands, including some which might be called polytechnics, can be found at the end of this list.

Brazil
Federal:
 Federal Centers for Technological Education (CEFET)
CEFET of Minas Gerais
CEFET of Rio de Janeiro
 Federal Institute of Education, Science and Technology (IFET)
 Federal Institute of Bahia
 Federal Institute of São Paulo
 Federal Technological University of Paraná
Service academy:
 Instituto Militar de Engenharia
 Instituto Tecnológico de Aeronáutica
Private:
 Instituto Nacional de Telecomunicações – Inatel
State:
 Sao Paulo State Technological College

Bulgaria

 Technical University of Gabrovo 
 Technical University of Sofia 
 Technical University of Varna 
 University of Chemical Technology and Metallurgy

Cambodia
In Cambodia, there are institutes of technology/polytechnic institutes and Universities that offer instruction in a variety of programs that can lead to: certificates, diplomas and degrees. Institutes of technology/polytechnic institutes and universities tend to be independent institutions.

Institutes of technology/polytechnic institutes
Institute of Technology of Cambodia (ITC) or Institute of Technology of Cambodia or Institut de Technologie du Cambodge (polytechnic institute in Phnom Penh, Cambodia)
Phnom Penh Institute of Technology (PPIT) or Phnom Penh Institute of Technology (polytechnic institute in Phnom Penh, Cambodia)

Universities
 RUPP or Royal Université de Phnom Penh (polytechnic university in Phnom Penh, Cambodia)

Canada
In Canada, there are affiliate schools, colleges, institutes of technology/polytechnic institutes, and universities that offer instruction in a variety of programs that can lead to engineering and applied science degrees, apprenticeships, trade programs, certificates, and diplomas. Affiliate schools are polytechnic divisions belonging to a national university and offer select technical and engineering programs. Colleges, institutes of technology/polytechnic institutes, and universities tend to be independent institutions.

Credentials are typically conferred at the undergraduate level; however, university-affiliated schools like the École de technologie supérieure and the École Polytechnique de Montréal (both of which are located in Quebec), also offer graduate and postgraduate programs, in accordance with provincial higher education guidelines. Canadian higher education institutions, at all levels, undertake directed and applied research with financing allocated through public funding, private equity, or industry sources.

Some of Canada's most esteemed colleges and polytechnic institutions also partake in collaborative institute-industry projects, leading to technology commercialization, made possible through the scope of Polytechnics Canada, a national alliance of eleven leading research-intensive colleges and institutes of technology.

Affiliate schools
École de technologie supérieure (ETS) (technical school part of the Université du Québec system in Montreal, Quebec)
École Polytechnique de Montréal (polytechnic school affiliated with the Université de Montréal in Montreal, Quebec)

Colleges
Algonquin College (Ottawa, Ontario)
Conestoga College (Kitchener, Ontario)
George Brown College (Toronto, Ontario)
Humber College (Toronto)
Red River College (college in Winnipeg, Manitoba, offering degrees)
Seneca College of Applied Arts and Technology (Toronto)
St. Clair College (Windsor)

Institutes of technology/polytechnic institutes
British Columbia Institute of Technology (BCIT; polytechnic institute in Burnaby, British Columbia)
Kwantlen Polytechnic University (polytechnic university in Surrey, British Columbia)
Northern Alberta Institute of Technology (NAIT; polytechnic institute in Edmonton, Alberta)
Toronto Metropolitan University (formerly Ryerson Polytechnical Institute, university in Toronto, Ontario) – The former Ryerson University was one of the originators of applied education in Ontario and Canada. It dropped the term "polytechnic" in 1993 when it was able to grant master's and doctoral degrees, using the term "university" instead and changed the name of some degree designations to bring it in line with other traditional research universities.
Saskatchewan Polytechnic, formerly SIAST (polytechnic institute; multiple campuses with headquarters in Saskatoon, Saskatchewan)
Sheridan College (polytechnic institute in Oakville, Ontario)
Southern Alberta Institute of Technology (SAIT; polytechnic institute in Calgary, Alberta)
University of Ontario Institute of Technology (UOIT; university in Oshawa, Ontario)

China 

China's modern higher education began in 1895 with the Imperial Tientsin University which was a polytechnic plus a law department.  Liberal arts were not offered until three years later at Capital University.  To this day, about half of China's elite universities remain essentially polytechnical. Harbin Institute of Technology is among the best engineering school in China and the world.

Chile 
 Federico Santa María Technical University (UTFSM), currently the only active technical university / Intitute of technology in Chile, founded initially in 1931 as School of Crafts and Arts and School of Engineering José Miguel Carrera, 18,000 students

Costa Rica 
 The National Technical University (UTN) founded in 2008 by merging several trade and craftsmanship schools, it is a polytechnic.
 The Costa Rica Institute of Technology (TEC) was founded in 1971, has its main campus located in the Cartago province, it is an institute of technology.

Croatia 
In Croatia there are many polytechnic institutes and colleges that offer a polytechnic education. The law about polytechnic education in Croatia was passed in 1997.

Czech Republic

Technical universities

 Brno University of Technology (VUT), founded in 1899, 24,000 students
 Collegium Nobilium in Olomouc, 1725–1847
 Czech Technical University in Prague (ČVUT), college founded in 1707, university since 1806, 23,000 students, belongs to the oldest technical universities in the world
 Czech University of Life Sciences Prague (ČZU), founded in 1904, focused on agriculture, 18,000 students
 Institute of Chemical Technology in Prague (VŠCHT), founded in 1952, 3,000 student
 Mendel University Brno (MENDELU), founded in 1919, focused on agriculture, 9,000 students
 Technical University of Liberec (TUL), founded in 1953, 8,000 students
 Technical University of Ostrava (VŠB TUO), founded in 1849, 22,000 students
 Tomáš Baťa University in Zlín (UTB), founded in 2000, 10,000 students

Research institutions
 Academy of Sciences of the Czech Republic (AV ČR), dates back to 1784, 14,000 research staff altogether

Technical faculties at universities
 Jan Evangelista Purkyně University in Ústí nad Labem (Faculty of Production Technology and Management, University founded in 1991)
 University of Pardubice (Faculty of Chemical Technology since 1950, Jan Perner Faculty of Transportation since 1991, Institute of Electrical Engineering and Informatics since 2002)
 University of West Bohemia (Faculty of Mechanical Engineering, Faculty of Electrical Engineering; University founded in 1991)

Denmark
Technical University of Denmark, founded in 1829 by Hans Christian Ørsted

Dominican Republic
 Instituto Tecnológico de Santo Domingo
 Universidad Tecnológica de Santiago

Ecuador
 National Polytechnic School (EPN), National Polytechnic School, Quito, Ecuador

EPN is known for research and education in the applied science, astronomy, atmospheric physics, engineering and physical sciences. The Geophysics Institute monitors the country's seismic, tectonic and volcanic activity in the continental territory and in the Galápagos Islands.

One of the oldest observatories in South America is the Quito Astronomical Observatory. It was founded in 1873 and is located 12 minutes south of the Equator in Quito, Ecuador.  The Quito Astronomical Observatory is the National Observatory of Ecuador and is located in the Historic Center of Quito and is managed by the National Polytechnic School.

The Nuclear Science Department at EPN is the only one in Ecuador and has the large infrastructure, related to irradiation facilities like cobalt-60 source and electron beam processing.

Egypt
 Alexandria Higher Institute of Engineering and Technology (AIET)
 Higher Technological Institute
 Institute of Aviation Engineering and Technology

Estonia
 Tallinn University of Technology (TalTech), a public research university
 Tallinn University of Applied Sciences, a public vocational university
 Estonian Entrepreneurship University of Applied Sciences, a private institution in Tallinn

Finland
Universities of technology
Universities of technology are categorised as universities, are allowed to grant B.Sc. (Tech.), Diplomi-insinööri M.Sc. (Tech.), Lic.Sc. (Tech.), Ph.D. and D.Sc. (Tech.) degrees and roughly correspond to Instituts de technologie of French-speaking areas and Technische Universität of Germany in prestige. In addition to universities of technology, some universities, e.g. University of Oulu and Åbo Akademi University, are allowed to grant the B.Sc. (tech.), M.Sc. (tech.) and D.Sc. (Tech.) degrees.

Universities of technology are academically similar to other (non-polytechnic) universities. Prior to Bologna process, M.Sc. (Tech.) required 180 credits, whereas M.Sc. from a normal university required 160 credits. The credits between universities of technology and normal universities are comparable.

Some Finnish universities of technology are:
Aalto University formed from Helsinki University of Technology and other universities
Lappeenranta-Lahti University of Technology LUT

Polytechnics
Polytechnic schools are distinct from academic universities in Finland. Ammattikorkeakoulu is the common term in Finland, as is the Swedish alternative "yrkeshögskola" – their focus is on studies leading to a degree (for instance insinööri, engineer; in international use, Bachelor of Engineering) in kind different from but in level comparable to an academic bachelor's degree awarded by a university. Since 2006 the polytechnics have offered studies leading to master's degrees (Master of Engineering).  After January 1, 2006, some Finnish ammattikorkeakoulus switched the English term "polytechnic" to the term "university of applied sciences" in the English translations of their legal names. The ammattikorkeakoulu has many similarities to the hogeschool in Belgium and in the Netherlands and to the Fachhochschule in the German language areas.

Some recognized Finnish polytechnics are:
Helsinki Metropolia University of Applied Sciences
Lapland University of Applied Sciences
Tampere University of Applied Sciences
Turku University of Applied Sciences

A complete list may be found in List of polytechnics in Finland.

France and Francophone regions
Instituts de technologie (grandes écoles)
Collegiate universities grouping several engineering schools or multi-site clusters of French grandes écoles provide sciences and technology curricula as autonomous higher education engineering institutes. They include:
 Arts et Métiers ParisTech
 Centrale Graduate School
 Grenoble Institute of Technology
 Institut national des sciences appliquées
 Institut Supérieur de l'Aéronautique et de l'Espace
 Paris Institute of Technology
 ESTIA Institute of Technology
They provide science and technology master's degrees and doctoral degrees.

Universités technologiques / instituts universitaires de technologie / polytechs
The universities of technology are public institutions awarding degrees and diplomas that are accredited by the French Ministry of Higher Education and Research.  Although called "universities", the universities of technology are in fact non-university institutes (écoles extérieures aux universités), as defined by Chapter I, Section II (Articles 34 through 36) of French law 84-52 of 26 January 1984 regarding higher education (the loi Savary).

They possess the advantage of combining all the assets of the engineering Grandes Écoles and those of universities as they develop simultaneously and coherently three missions: Education, Research, Transfer of technology.
They maintain close links with the industrial world both on national and international levels and they are reputed for their ability to innovate, adapt and provide an education that matches the ever-changing demands of industry.

This network includes three institutions:
 The University of Technology of Belfort-Montbéliard (Université de Technologie de Belfort-Montbéliard or UTBM)
 The University of Technology of Compiègne (Université de Technologie de Compiègne or UTC)
 The University of Technology of Troyes (Université de Technologie de Troyes or UTT)

In addition, France's education system includes many institutes of technology, embedded within most French universities. They are referred-to as institut universitaire de technologie (IUT). Instituts universitaires de technologie provide undergraduate technology curricula. 'Polytech institutes', embedded as a part of eleven French universities provide both undergraduate and graduate engineering curricula.

In the French-speaking part of Switzerland exists also the term haute école specialisée for a type of institution called Fachhochschule in the German-speaking part of the country. (see below).

Écoles polytechniques
Higher education systems, that are influenced by the French education system set at the end of the 18th century, use a terminology derived by reference to the French École polytechnique. Such terms include Écoles Polytechniques (Algeria, Belgium, Canada, France, Switzerland, Tunisia), Escola Politécnica (Brasil, Spain), Polytechnicum (Eastern Europe).

In French language, higher education refers to écoles polytechniques, providing science and engineering curricula:
 École polytechnique or X (near Paris)
 École polytechnique de Bruxelles
 École polytechnique de Montréal
 École polytechnique fédérale de Lausanne
National Polytechnic Institute of Lorraine
National Polytechnic Institute of Toulouse

Germany
Fachhochschule

Fachhochschulen were first founded in the early 1970s. They do not focus exclusively on technology, but may also offer courses in social science, medicine, business and design. They grant bachelor's degrees and master's degrees and focus more on teaching than research and more on specific professions than on science.

In 2009/10, there existed about 200 Fachhochschulen in Germany. See the German Wikipedia for a list.

Technische Universität

Technische Universität (abbreviation: TU) is the common term for universities of technology or technical university. These institutions can grant habilitation and doctoral degrees and focus on research.

The nine largest and most renowned Technische Universitäten in Germany have formed TU9 German Institutes of Technology as community of interests. Technische Universitäten normally have faculties or departements of natural sciences and often of economics but can also have units of cultural and social sciences and arts. RWTH Aachen, TU Dresden and TU München also have a faculty of medicine associated with university hospitals (Klinikum Aachen, University Hospital Dresden, Rechts der Isar Hospital).

There are 17 universities of technology in Germany with about 290,000 students enrolled. The four states of Bremen, Mecklenburg-Vorpommern, Saxony-Anhalt and Schleswig-Holstein are not operating a Technische Universität. Saxony and Lower Saxony have the highest counts of TUs, while in Saxony three out of four universities are universities of technology.

Greece
Greece has Technical Universities (also known as Polytechnic Universities) with 5 years of study legally equivalent to Bachelor's and master's degree 300 ECTS, ISCED 7 and has the full professional rights of the Engineer. and had Technological Educational Institutes (TEIs) (1982–2019) also known as Higher Educational Institute of Technology, Technological Institute, Institute of Technology (provides at least 4-year undergraduate degree qualification πτυχίο, Latinised version: Ptychion, in line with the Bologna Process legally equivalent to Bachelor's honours degree 240 ECTS, ISCED 6. Previoulsy it was three and a half years studies from 1983 to 1995, 210 ECTS). All the Technical Universities and Technological Educational Institutes are Higher Education Institutions (HEIs) with university title (UT) and degree awarding powers (DAPs). TEIs existed from 1983 to 2019; they were reformed between 2013 and 2019 and their departments incorporated into existing higher education institutions (HEIs).

The two Polytechnic Universities (Technical Universities) in Greece (Greek: Πολυτεχνείο) are the National Technical University of Athens  and the Technical University of Crete. However, many other universities have a faculty of engineering that provides an equivalent diploma of engineerings with an integrated master and the full professional rights as well.

Many TEIs that got dismantled created engineering faculty with 5 years of study and 300 ECTS, ISCED 6. But those faculty are not under the general term of Polytechnics nor they have an integrated master's degree yet waiting evaluation to be characterised as equivalent. These have been named School of Engineers for the time being and not Technical Universities or Polytechnic.

In Greece, all Higher Education Institutions (HEIs) are public university owned and government-funded, with free education undergraduate programmes that can be attended without any payment of tuition fee. About 1 out of 4 (one-fourth of) HEIs postgraduate programmes are offered free without any payment of tuition fee, especially about a 30% percentage of students can be entitled without tuition fee to attend all the HEIs statutory tuition fee postgraduate programmes after they be assessed on an individual basis of determined criteria as set out in the Ministry of Education.

Hong Kong

The first polytechnic in Hong Kong is The Hong Kong Polytechnic, established in 1972 through upgrading the Hong Kong Technical College (Government Trade School before 1947). The second polytechnic, the City Polytechnic of Hong Kong, was founded in 1984. These polytechnics awards diplomas, higher diplomas, as well as academic degrees. Like the United Kingdom, the two polytechnics were granted university status in 1994 and renamed The Hong Kong Polytechnic University and the City University of Hong Kong respectively. The Hong Kong University of Science and Technology, a university with a focus in applied science, engineering and business, was founded in 1991.

Hungary
The world's first Institute of Technology the Berg-Schola (Bergschule) established in Selmecbánya, Kingdom of Hungary, by the Court Chamber of Vienna in 1735 providing Further education to train specialists of precious metal and copper mining. In 1762 the institute ranked up to be Academia providing Higher Education courses. After the Treaty of Trianon the institute had to be moved to Sopron.
 University of Miskolc re-established in 1949 as Technical University of Heavy Industry in Miskolc and in 1990 as University of Miskolc. The university is the successor of the University of Mining and Metallurgy of Selmecbánya (est. as Bergshule 1735).
 Budapest University of Technology and Economics, one of the oldest institute of technology of the world is located in Budapest (est. 1782). The BME was the first University in Europe to award engineering degrees.
 University of Debrecen – Faculty of Engineering
 University of Dunaújváros
 Pallasz Athéné University – GAMF
 University of Nyíregyháza – Institute of Technical and Agricultural Sciences
 University of Sopron
 University of Szeged – Faculty of Engineering
 Szent István University
 Széchenyi István University
 University of Pannonia
 University of Pécs – Faculty of Engineering and Information Technology
 Óbuda University

India
There are Indian Institutes of Technology, Indian Institutes of Information Technology, and National Institutes of Technology in India which are autonomous public institutions. These institutions are Institutes of National Importance, and hence each of the institutions are autonomous. All Indian Institutes of Technology, Indian Institutes of Information Technology, and National Institutes of Technology have their own councils which are headed by President of India. The activities of these institutions are generally governed by the institutes alone, but sometimes they are bound to follow the directives of Ministry of Education (India) and are answerable to Ministry of Education (India) and President of India. Some departments of some of these institutions are bound to follow certain guidelines of National Board of Accreditation (NBA) if they receive the accreditation from NBA. However, unlike other institutions, it is not mandatory for these institutes to follow guidelines of All India Council for Technical Education (AICTE) and NBA completely.

The authority controlling technical education, other than the Institutes of National Importance, in India is All India Council for Technical Education (AICTE) and National Board of Accreditation (NBA).

Indonesia
There are four public institutes of technology in Indonesia that are owned by the government of Indonesia. Other than that, there are hundreds of other institutes that are owned by private or other institutions.

Four public institutes are:
 Bandung Institute of Technology, Bandung
 Sepuluh Nopember Institute of Technology, Surabaya
 Kalimantan Institute of Technology, Balikpapan
 Sumatera Institute of Technology, Bandar Lampung

Public state-owned polytechnics also available and provides vocational education offers either three-year Diploma degrees, which is similar to an associate degree or four-year bachelor's degree in applied sciences. The more advanced vocational Master's are also available and doctoral degrees are still in progress.

Some notable polytechnics in Indonesia includes State Polytechnic of Jakarta, State Polytechnic of Bandung, State Polytechnic of Malang, State Electronics Polytechnic of Surabaya, and State Naval and Shipbuilding Polytechnic of Surabaya. These polytechnics are known to be departed from Indonesian prestigious universities and institute of technologies, e.g. the State Polytechnic of Jakarta was departed from the University of Indonesia while both Surabaya Polytechnics were departed from Sepuluh Nopember Institute of Technology.

Iran
There are 18 technological universities in Iran.

Amirkabir University of Technology (Tehran Polytechnic), Tehran
Sharif University of Technology, Tehran
Technical and Vocational University, 172 branches in Iran 
Iran University of Science and Technology, Tehran
K. N. Toosi University of Technology, Tehran
Petroleum University of Technology, Tehran and Ahwaz
Isfahan University of Technology, Isfahan
Sahand University of Technology, Tabriz
Shiraz University of Technology, Shiraz
Arak University of Technology, Arak
Urmia University of Technology, Urmia
Babol University of Technology, Babol
Shahrood University of Technology, Shahrood
Hamedan University of Technology, Hamedan
Kermanshah University of Technology, Kermanshah
Qom University of Technology, Qom
Birjand University of Technology, Birjand
Jondi-Shapur University of Technology, Dezful
Sirjan University of Technology, Sirjan

Iraq

 University of Technology, Iraq

Ireland

An "Institute of Technology" was formerly referred to as Regional Technical College (RTCs) system. The abbreviation IT is now widely used to refer to an Institute of Technology. These institutions offer sub-degree, degree and masters level studies. Unlike the Irish university system an Institute of Technology also offers sub-degree programmes such as 2-year Higher Certificate programme in various academic fields of study.  Some institutions have "delegated authority" that allows them to make doctoral awards in their own name, after authorisation by the Quality and Qualifications Ireland.

Dublin Institute of Technology developed separately from the Regional Technical College system and after several decades of association with the University of Dublin it acquired the authority to confer its own degrees before becoming a member of the T.U. Dublin.

The Technological Higher Education Association is the representative body for the various Institutes of Technology in Ireland.

The approval of Ireland's first Technological University, TU Dublin was announced in July 2018. It is the result of a merger of three of the ITs in the County Dublin area.

Munster TU and Technological University of the Shannon: Midlands Midwest have since been approved.

Planning is underway for the formation similar merged institutions across the country.

Israel
 Technion – Israel Institute of Technology, ranked 38 in the world in 2010.

Italy

In Italy, the term "technical institute" generally refers to a secondary school which offers a five-year course granting the access to the university system.

In higher education, Politecnico refers to a technical university awarding bachelor, master and PhD degrees in engineering. Historically there were two Politecnici, one in each of the two largest industrial cities of the north:
 Politecnico di Torino, established 1859;
 Politecnico di Milano, established 1863.
A third Politecnico was added in the south in 1990:
 Politecnico di Bari, established 1990.
However, many other universities have a faculty of engineering.

In 2003, the Ministry of Education, Universities and Research (Italy) and the Ministry of Economy and Finance (Italy) jointly established the Istituto Italiano di Tecnologia (Italian Institute of Technology), headquartered in Genoa with 10 laboratories around Italy, which however focuses on research, not entirely in the fields of engineering and does not offer undergraduate degrees.

Jamaica
University of Technology, Jamaica, in Kingston, Jamaica

Japan

See also the Imperial College of Engineering, which was the forerunner of the University of Tokyo's engineering faculty.

National
Tokyo Institute of Technology, 1929
Kyoto Institute of Technology, 1949
Muroran Institute of Technology, 1949
Nagoya Institute of Technology, 1949
Kyushu Institute of Technology, 1949
University of Electro-Communications, 1949
Tokyo University of Agriculture and Technology, 1949
Kitami Institute of Technology, 1966
Nagaoka University of Technology, 1976
Japan Advanced Institute of Science And Technology, 1986
Nara Institute of Science and Technology, 2006
Okinawa Institute of Science and Technology, 2011
Public
Tokyo Metropolitan Institute of Technology, 1986
Maebashi Institute of Technology, 1997
Kochi University of Technology, 1997
Advanced Institute of Industrial Technology, 2006
Private
Chiba Institute of Technology, 1942
Osaka Institute of Technology, 1949
Shibaura Institute of Technology, 1949
Tokyo Polytechnic University, 1950
Kobe Institute of Computing, 1958
Aichi Institute of Technology, 1959
Hiroshima Institute of Technology, 1963
Fukuoka Institute of Technology, 1963
Shonan Institute of Technology, 1963
Tohoku Institute of Technology, 1964
Kanazawa Institute of Technology, 1965
Fukui University of Technology, 1965
Nippon Institute of Technology, 1967
Hokkaido Institute of Technology, 1967
Ashikaga Institute of Technology, 1967
Hachinohe Technical University, 1972
Kanagawa Institute of Technology, 1975
Toyohashi University of Technology, 1976
Saitama Institute of Technology, 1976
Tokyo University of Technology, 1986
Kobe Design University, 1989
Tohoku University of Art and Design, 1991
Shizuoka Institute of Science and Technology, 1991
Niigata Institute of Technology, 1995
Aichi University of Technology, 2000

Kenya
In Kenya, Technical Universities are special Universities that focus on technical and engineering courses and offer certifications in the same from Artisan, Craft, Diploma, Higher Diploma, Degree, Masters and Doctorate levels. They are former national polytechnics and are the only institutions of learning that offer the complete spectrum of tertiary education programs.
They Include
 Technical University of Kenya, Formerly Kenya National Polytechnic in Nairobi
 Technical University of Mombasa, Formerly Mombasa National Polytechnic in Mombasa

Jordan
Princess Sumaya University for Technology in Amman
Jordan University of Science and Technology in Irbid
Balqa Applied University in Salt
Tafila Technical University in Tafila

Macau 

The first polytechnic in Macau is the Polytechnic Institute of the University of East Asia which was established in 1981, as an institute of a private university. In 1991, following the splitting of the University of East Asia into three (University of Macau, Macao Polytechnic Institute, Asia International Open University), a public and independent Polytechnic Institute, Macao Polytechnic Institute, was officially established. The first private technology university Macau University of Science and Technology is established in 2000. Macao Polytechnic Institute has renamed Macao Polytechnic University in 2022.

Malaysia

Polytechnics
Polytechnics in Malaysia has been operated for almost 53 years. The institutions provide courses for bachelor's degree & Bachelor of Science (BSc) (offer at Premier Polytechnics for September 2013 & 2014 intake), Advanced Diploma, Diploma and Special Skills Certificate. It was established by the Ministry of Education with the help of UNESCO in 1969. The amount of RM24.5 million is used to fund the pioneer of Politeknik Ungku Omar located in Ipoh, Perak from the United Nations Development Program (UNDP).

At present, Malaysia have developed 36 polytechnic at all over states in engineering, agriculture, commerce, hospitality and design courses with 60,840 students in 2009 to 87,440 students in 2012.

The following is a list of the polytechnics in Malaysia in order of establishment:

Technical University
There are four technical universities in Malaysia and all are belongs to Malaysian Technical University Network: 
Universiti Tun Hussein Onn Malaysia
Universiti Malaysia Perlis
Universiti Teknikal Malaysia Melaka
Universiti Malaysia Pahang

Mauritius
The only technical university in Mauritius is the University of Technology, Mauritius with its main campus situated in La Tour Koenig, Pointe aux Sables. It has a specialized mission with a technology focus. It applies traditional and beyond traditional approaches to teaching, training, research and consultancy. The university has been founded with the aim to play a key role in the economic and social development of Mauritius through the development of programmes of direct relevance to the country's needs, for example in areas like technology, sustainable development science and public sector policy and management.

Mexico
In Mexico there are different Institutes and Colleges of Technology. Most of them are public institutions.

The National Technological Institute of Mexico (in Spanish: , TecNM) is a Mexican public university system created on 23 July 2014 by presidential decree with the purpose to unify 263 public institutes of technology that had been created since 1948 and are found all around Mexico.

Another important institute of technology in Mexico is the National Polytechnic Institute, which is located in the northern region of Mexico City.

Moldova

 Technical University of Moldova

Nepal
Institute of Engineering
CTEVT, Council for Technical Education and Vocational Training

New Zealand

New Zealand polytechnics are established under the Education Act 1989 as amended and are typically considered state-owned tertiary institutions along with universities, colleges of education and wānanga; there is today often much crossover in courses and qualifications offered between all these types of Tertiary Education Institutions. Some have officially taken the title 'institute of technology' which is a term recognized in government strategies equal to that of the term 'polytechnic'.  One has opted for the name 'Universal College of Learning' (UCOL) and another 'Unitec New Zealand'. These are legal names but not recognized terms like 'polytechnic' or 'institute of technology'.  Many if not all now grant at least bachelor-level degrees. Some colleges of education or institutes of technology are privately owned, however, the qualification levels vary widely.

Since the 1990s, there has been consolidation in New Zealand's state-owned tertiary education system. In the polytechnic sector: Wellington Polytechnic amalgamated with Massey University. The Central Institute of Technology explored a merger with the Waikato Institute of Technology, which was abandoned, but later, after financial concerns, controversially amalgamated with Hutt Valley Polytechnic, which in turn became Wellington Institute of Technology. Some smaller polytechnics in the North Island, such as Waiarapa Polytechnic, amalgamated with UCOL. (The only other amalgamations have been in the colleges of education.)

The Auckland University of Technology is the only polytechnic to have been elevated to university status; while Unitec has had repeated attempts blocked by government policy and consequent decisions; Unitec has not been able to convince the courts to overturn these decisions.

In mid-February 2019, the Minister of Education Minister Chris Hipkins proposed merging the country's sixteen polytechnics into a "NZ Institute of Skills and Technology" in response to deficits and a decline in domestic enrollments. The proposed merger will be subject to a six-week consultation period until 27 March.

Nigeria

Virtually, every state in Nigeria has a polytechnic university operated by either the federal or state government. In Rivers State for example, there are two state-owned polytechnic universities; Kenule Beeson Saro-Wiwa Polytechnic, Bori City and the Rivers State College of Arts and Science, Port Harcourt. The former was established on 13 May 1988 while the latter–though founded in 1984–was approved by the NBTE in 2006. The first private polytechnic university in the state is the Eastern Polytechnic, established in 2008.

Pakistan
The polytechnic institutes in Pakistan offer Diploma in Engineering spanning three years in different engineering branches. This diploma is known as Diploma of Associate Engineering (DAE). Students are admitted to the diploma program based on their results in the 10th grade standardized exams. The main purpose of the diploma offered in polytechnic institutes is to train people in various trades.

These institutes are located throughout Pakistan and started in early 1950s.

After successfully completion of diploma at a polytechnic, students can either get employment or enroll in Bachelor of Technology (B.Tech) and Bachelor of Engineering (BE) degree programs.

Universities of Engineering & Technology in Pakistan offer undergraduate (BE/BS/BSc Engineering) and postgraduate (ME/MS/MSc Engineering and PhD) degree programs in engineering. BE/BS/BSc Engineering is a professional degree in Pakistan. It is a four-year full-time program after HSSC (higher secondary school certificate).

Palestine
University College of Applied Sciences University College of Applied Sciences (UCAS) is a technical college in Gaza founded in 1998. The College offers undergraduate degrees in a number of unique specializations such as education technology, technological management and planning, and geographic information systems

Philippines
Mapúa University, the premier engineering school of the Philippines. Being an internationally accredited engineering school, it consistently tops various board exams for engineering students in the Philippines.
FEU Institute of Technology, a premier engineering school known for its technological academic teaching and board topnotchers operating under the Far Eastern University system.
Mindanao State University–Iligan Institute of Technology, the premier state university in the southern Philippines and the science and technology flagship campus of the Mindanao State University System (the second biggest university system in the Philippines after the University of the Philippines).
Technological University of the Philippines, the premier state university of technology education in the Philippines.
Technological Institute of the Philippines, an engineering school with an international accreditation.
Bicol University, center in teaching excellence, offers IT courses and a well known university.
Cebu Institute of Technology – University, a premier engineering school, this university is known to have high selectivity in admissions as well as excellence in engineering research and education.
Cebu Technological University
Polytechnic University of the Philippines, a state university in the Philippines that consistently tops various board exams for engineering students in the Philippines, also referred to as the National Comprehensive University of the Philippines.
Quezon City Polytechnic University, a local university, this university is well known in engineering, IT and technical education.
Rizal Technological University, the only university that offers degree courses in astronomy.

Poland
Politechnika (translated as a "technical university" or "university of technology") is the designation of a technical university in Poland. Here are some of the larger polytechnics in Poland:
Politechnika Śląska
Politechnika Wrocławska
Politechnika Warszawska
Politechnika Poznańska
Politechnika Krakowska
Politechnika Gdańska
Politechnika Łódzka
Politechnika Białostocka
Politechnika Lubelska
Other polytechnic universities:
Akademia Górniczo-Hutnicza
Uniwersytet Technologiczno-Przyrodniczy im. Jana i Jędrzeja Śniadeckich w Bydgoszczy (University of Technology and Life Sciences in Bydgoszcz)
Zachodniopomorski Uniwersytet Technologiczny (West Pomeranian University of Technology)

Portugal

Till recently, there was a Technical University of Lisbon (UTL). It included several of the most prestigious schools, including, an engineering school (Instituto Superior Tecnico) and one of the most ancient business schools in the world (ISEG Lisbon). But UTL merged with the University of Lisbon.  In this field, here are also a number of non-university higher educational institutions which are called polytechnic institutes since 1970s. Some of these institutions existed since the 19th century with different designations (industrial and commercial institutes, agricultural managers, elementary teachers and nurses schools, etc.). In theory, the polytechnics higher education system is aimed to provide a more practical training and be profession-oriented, while the university higher education system is aimed to have a stronger theoretical basis and be highly research-oriented. The polytechnics are also oriented to provide shorter length studies aimed to respond to local needs. The Portuguese polytechnics can then be compared to the US community colleges.

Since the implementation of Bologna Process in Portugal in 2007, the polytechnics offer the 1st cycle (licentiate degree) and 2nd cycle (master's degree) of higher studies. Until 1998, the polytechnics only awarded bachelor degrees (three-year short-cycle degrees) and were not authorized to award higher degrees. They however granted post-bachelor diplomas in specialized higher studies (DESE), that could be obtained after the conclusion of a two-year second cycle of studies and were academical equivalent to the university's licentiate degrees. After 1998, they started to be allowed to confer their own licentiate degrees, which replaced the DESE diplomas.

Romania

 Politehnica University of Bucharest, 1864
 Polytechnic University of Timișoara, 1920
 Gheorghe Asachi Technical University of Iași, 1937
 Technical University of Cluj-Napoca, 1948
 Technical University of Civil Engineering of Bucharest, 1948
 Oil & Gas University of Ploieşti, 1948
 University of Petroşani, 1948
 Technical Military Academy of Bucharest, 1949

Russia

 Bauman Moscow State Technical University
 Saint Petersburg Polytechnical University
 Novosibirsk State Technical University
 Tomsk Polytechnic University
 Moscow Polytechnic University

Singapore

Polytechnics in Singapore do not offer bachelor's, master's degrees or doctorate. However, Polytechnics in Singapore offer three-year diploma courses in fields ranging from applied sciences to business, information technology, humanities, social sciences, and other vocational fields such as engineering and nursing. There are five polytechnics in Singapore: Singapore Polytechnic, Ngee Ann Polytechnic, Temasek Polytechnic, Nanyang Polytechnic and Republic Polytechnic.

The Polytechnic diploma certification in Singapore is equivalent to an associate degree obtainable at the community colleges in the United States. A Polytechnic diploma in Singapore is also known to be parallel and sometimes equivalent to the first years at a bachelor's degree-granting institution, thus, Polytechnic graduates in Singapore have the privilege of being granted transfer credits or module exemptions when they apply to a local or overseas universities, depending on the university's policies on transfer credits.

The only university in Singapore with the term "institute of technology", most notably the Singapore Institute of Technology were developed in 2009 as an option for Polytechnic graduates who desire to pursue a bachelor's degree. Other technological university in Singapore includes the Nanyang Technological University and the Singapore University of Technology and Design.

Slovakia
Slovak University of Technology in Bratislava
The world's first institution of technology or technical university with tertiary technical education is the Banská Akadémia in Banská Štiavnica, Slovakia, founded in 1735, Academy since December 13, 1762 established by queen Maria Theresa in order to train specialists of silver and gold mining and metallurgy in neighbourhood. Teaching started in 1764. Later the department of Mathematics, Mechanics and Hydraulics and department of Forestry were settled. University buildings are still at their place today and are used for teaching. University has launched the first book of electrotechnics in the world.

Technical University of Košice
University of Žilina
Technical University in Zvolen
Trenčín University in Trenčín
Dubnica Technology Institute

South Africa

In South Africa, there was a division has existed in South Africa between universities and technikons (polytechnics), as well between institutions servicing particular racial and language groupings.

By the mid-2000s, former technikons have either been merged with traditional universities to form comprehensive universities or have become universities of technology; however, the universities of technology have not to date acquired all of the traditional rights and privileges of a university (such as the ability to confer a wide range of degrees).

Spain 
 Universidad Politécnica de Madrid
 Universitat Politècnica de Catalunya
 Universitat Politècnica de València
 Universidad Politécnica de Cartagena

Sri Lanka

University of Moratuwa
Institute of Technology, University of Moratuwa
University of Vocational Technology
Sri Lanka Institute of Information Technology
Technical College

Sweden
 KTH Royal Institute of Technology, Stockholm
 Chalmers University of Technology, Gothenburg
Faculty of Engineering (LTH), Lund University, Lund
Luleå University of Technology, Luleå
Blekinge Institute of Technology, Blekinge

Switzerland
 Eidgenössische Technische Hochschule Zürich (ETH Zurich)
 École Polytechnique Fédérale de Lausanne (EPFL)

Taiwan

The question of Taiwanese college education is, the students either from high school (the aims is to go to normal college) or tech high school(the aims is to go to work or technology university), almost all of the students take the same test(the score can go to two kinds of school), and the school would not care what kind of high school you are from.
 National Taiwan University of Science and Technology
 National Taipei University of Technology
 National Taichung University of Science and Technology
 National Yunlin University of Science and Technology
 National Formosa University
 National Kaohsiung University of Science and Technology
 National Pingtung University of Science and Technology

Thailand

Most of Thailand's institutes of technology were developed from technical colleges, in the past could not grant bachelor's degrees; today, however, they are university level institutions, some of which can grant degrees to the doctoral level. Examples are Pathumwan Institute of Technology (developed from Pathumwan Technical School), King Mongkut's Institute of Technology Ladkrabang (Nondhaburi Telecommunications Training Centre) and King Mongkut's Institute of Technology North Bangkok (Thai-German Technical School).

There are two former institutes of technology, which already changed their name to "University of Technology": Rajamangala University of Technology (formerly Institute of Technology and Vocational Education) and King Mongkut's University of Technology Thonburi (Thonburi Technology Institute).

Institutes of technology with different origins are Asian Institute of Technology, which developed from SEATO Graduate School of Engineering and Sirindhorn International Institute of Technology, an engineering school of Thammasat University. Suranaree University of Technology is the only government-owned technological university in Thailand that was established (1989) as such; while Mahanakorn University of Technology is the most well known private technological institute.  Technology/Technical colleges in Thailand is associated with bitter rivalries which erupts into frequent off-campus brawls and assassinations of students in public locations that has been going on for nearly a decade, with innocent bystanders also commonly among the injured and the military under martial law still unable to stop them from occurring.

Turkey

In Turkey and the Ottoman Empire, the oldest technical university is Istanbul Technical University. Its graduates contributed to a wide variety of activities in scientific research and development. In the 1950s, two technical universities were opened in Ankara and Trabzon. In recent years, Yıldız University is reorganized as Yıldız Technical University and two institutes of technology were founded in Kocaeli and Izmir. In 2010, another technical university named Bursa Technical University was founded in Bursa. Moreover, a sixth technical university is about to be opened in Konya named Konya Technical University.

Ukraine
Donbas State Technical University
Donetsk National Technical University
Kyiv Polytechnic Institute
Kharkiv Polytechnic Institute
Lviv Polytechnic

United Kingdom
Polytechnics

Polytechnics were tertiary education teaching institutions in England, Wales and Northern Ireland. The comparable institutions in Scotland were collectively referred to as Central Institutions.

From 1965 to 1992, UK polytechnics operated under the binary system of education along with universities.  Polytechnics offered diplomas and degrees (bachelor's, master's, PhD) validated at the national level by the Council for National Academic Awards (CNAA).  Initially they excelled in engineering and applied science degree courses and other STEM subjects similar to technological universities in the US and continental Europe.  Polytechnics were associated with innovations including women's studies, the academic study of communications and media, sandwich degrees and the rise of management and business studies.

Britain's first polytechnic, the Royal Polytechnic Institution later known as the Polytechnic of Central London (now the University of Westminster) was established in 1838 at Regent Street in London and its goal was to educate and popularize engineering and scientific knowledge and inventions in Victorian Britain "at little expense".  The London Polytechnic led a mass movement to create numerous polytechnic institutes across the UK in the late 19th century.  Most polytechnic institutes were established at the centre of major metropolitan cities and their focus was on engineering, applied science and technology education.

The designation "institute of technology" was occasionally used by polytechnics (Bolton), Central Institutions (Dundee, Robert Gordon's) and postgraduate universities, (Cranfield and Wessex), most of which later adopted the designation university and there were two "institutes of science and technology": UMIST and UWIST (part of the University of Wales). Loughborough University was called Loughborough University of Technology from 1966 to 1996, the only institution in the UK to have had such a designation.

Polytechnics were granted university status under the Further and Higher Education Act 1992.  This meant that polytechnics could confer degrees without the oversight of the national CNAA organization.  These institutions are sometimes referred to as post-1992 universities.

Technical colleges

In 1956, some colleges of technology received the designation college of advanced technology. They became universities in 1966 meaning they could award their own degrees.

Institutions called "technical institutes" or "technical schools" that were formed in the early 20th century provided further education between high school and university or polytechnic.  Most technical institutes have been merged into regional colleges and some have been designated university colleges if they are associated with a local university.

In 2016 the UK government announced plans to establish new "Institutes of Technology" in England as part of its reforms to post-16 skills provision "to provide technical education in STEM subjects at levels 3, 4 and 5. Each IoT is likely to build on infrastructure that already exists but will have its own independent identity, governance arrangements which directly involve employers and national branding". The first wave of 12 institutes was announced in 2019. Bidding for a second wave started in 2020.

United States

Polytechnic institutes in the USA are elite technological universities, many dating back to the mid-19th century.  A handful of American universities include the phrases "Institute of Technology", "Polytechnic Institute", "Polytechnic University" or similar phrasing in their names; these are generally research-intensive universities with a focus on engineering, science and technology. The earliest of these institutions include: Rensselaer Polytechnic Institute (RPI, 1824), Rochester Institute of Technology (RIT, 1829), Brooklyn Collegiate and Polytechnic Institute (1854), Massachusetts Institute of Technology (MIT, 1861), Worcester Polytechnic Institute (WPI, 1865), Stevens Institute of Technology (1870), Virginia Polytechnic Institute and State University (VPI or VT, 1872), Rose-Hulman Institute of Technology (RHIT, 1874), Case Institute of Technology (1881), New Jersey Institute of Technology (NJIT, 1881), Georgia Institute of Technology (1885), California Institute of Technology (Caltech, 1891), Carnegie Institute of Technology (1900) and Industry (1891), Cal Poly San Luis Obispo (1901), and Cal Poly Pomona (1938). Conversely, schools dubbed "technical colleges" or "technical institutes" generally provide post-secondary training in technical and mechanical fields, focusing on training vocational skills primarily at a community college level, parallel and sometimes equivalent to the first two years at a bachelor's degree-granting institution.

Venezuela
Institutes of technology in Venezuela were developed in the 1950s as an option for post-secondary education in technical and scientific courses, after the polytechnic French concepts.  At that time, technical education was considered essential for the development of a sound middle class economy.

Nowadays, most of the Institutos de Tecnología are privately run businesses, with varying degrees of quality.

Most of these institutes award diplomas after three or three and a half years of education. The institute of technology implementation (IUT, from ) began with the creation of the first IUT at Caracas, the capital city of Venezuela, called IUT. Dr. Federico Rivero Palacio adopted the French "Institut Universitaire de Technologie"s system, using French personnel and study system based on three-year periods, with research and engineering facilities at the same level as the main national universities to obtain French equivalent degrees. This IUT is the first and only one in Venezuela having French equivalent degrees accepted, implementing this system and observing the high-level degrees some other IUTs were created in 
Venezuela, regardless of this the term IUT was not used appropriately resulting in some institutions with mediocre quality and no equivalent degree in France. Later, some private institutions sprang up using IUT in their names, but they are not regulated by the original French system and award lower quality degrees.

Vietnam
 Da Nang University of Technology
 Hanoi University of Science and Technology 
 Ho Chi Minh City University of Technology
 Le Quy Don Technical University
 FPT University

See also
 Comparison of US and UK Education
 Engineer's degree
 List of forestry universities and colleges
 List of institutions using the term "institute of technology" or "polytechnic"
 List of schools of mines
 Secondary Technical School
 University of Science and Technology
 Vocational university

References

External links
 

 
Engineering education
Vocational education